Wieńczysław Gliński (10 May 1921 – 8 July 2008) was a Polish stage and film actor.

He was a member of the Polish resistance movement  Home Army during World War II.  He was also a prisoner in the Nazi German concentration camp Majdanek.

After the war Wieńczysław Gliński has starred in many movies. He has also performed in many theatres, including the Polish Theatre and National Theatre in Warsaw.

A lecturer at the Państwowa Wyższa Szkoła Teatralna in Warsaw.

At the 1st Moscow International Film Festival he won a Silver Medal for acting for his role in the film The Eagle.

Filmography

References

External links

Wieńczysław Gliński at the FilmPolski.pl 

1921 births
2008 deaths
Polish cabaret performers
Polish educators
Polish male film actors
Polish male stage actors
Polish male voice actors
Polish male television actors
Majdanek concentration camp survivors
Home Army members
Commanders of the Order of Polonia Restituta
Recipients of the Order of the Banner of Work
Burials at Powązki Military Cemetery
20th-century Polish male actors
21st-century Polish male actors
People from Astrakhan
20th-century comedians
Recipient of the Meritorious Activist of Culture badge